is a former Japanese football player.

Club statistics

References

External links

1983 births
Living people
Shobi University alumni
Association football people from Saitama Prefecture
Japanese footballers
J2 League players
Thespakusatsu Gunma players
Association football defenders